The name Mitag has been used to name four tropical cyclones in the northwestern Pacific Ocean. The name was contributed by the Federated States of Micronesia and is a woman's name meaning "my eyes" in the Yapese language.
 Typhoon Mitag (2002) (T0202, 02W, Basyang) - A powerful Category 5 storm in March 2002, but did not affect land.
 Typhoon Mitag (2007) (T0723, 24W, Mina) – Struck the Philippines, killed 71, damages from the storm amounted to PHP945 million (US$19.79 million).
 Tropical Storm Mitag (2014) (T1406, Ester) – Recognised as a subtropical storm by the Joint Typhoon Warning Center.
 Typhoon Mitag (2019) (T1918, 19W, Onyok)

Pacific typhoon set index articles